Agripada is an area in South Mumbai. It is located between Byculla (West) and Mumbai Central (East). This area is connected with the Central Railway as well as the Western Railway. Agripada is also notable for its YMCA which has a swimming pool and various indoor and outdoor sports facilities. A large number of schools, including municipal schools, convents, Marathi, Hindi and English medium schools are located in this area.

Maratha Mandir is the nearest cinema hall. The other surrounding areas are Mumbai Central, Byculla, Nagpada, Madanpura and Mahalaxmi. Agripada also has a large number of mosques, of which Arab Masjid and Al-Madina Masjid are the most famous.

References

External links
Times of India
Indian Express
"A Community of "others" in the Making"

Neighbourhoods in Mumbai